William Kelly was a Negro league catcher in the 1940s.

Kelly made his Negro leagues debut in 1944 with the New York Black Yankees, and played with New York again the following season.

References

External links
 and Seamheads

Place of birth missing
Place of death missing
Year of birth missing
Year of death missing
New York Black Yankees players
Baseball catchers